A Braille magazine is a paper magazine embossed in the braille format.

Many regular periodicals issue braille editions, printed in a format sometimes called "Press Braille".

Publications
In the United States, a free national service circulates braille magazines and other publications.

References 

Braille publications
Magazine publishing